El amor is a 1975 album by Spanish singer Julio Iglesias.  It was released on the Alhambra label. It received Diamond certification in Argentina.

Track listing

Charts

Weekly charts

Year-end charts

Certifications and sales

See also
List of diamond-certified albums in Argentina

References

Sources and external links
 Julio Iglesias Discography

1975 albums
Julio Iglesias albums
Spanish-language albums